Pieter Perret (  1555–1625) was a Flemish engraver who worked in Madrid in the service of Philip II of Spain.

He married Isabel de Faria, who was born in Portugal, with whom he had a son, also named Peter. His son, also an engraver, Hispanicized his name and went by "Pedro Perete".

Background 

Born in Antwerp around 1555, he was a pupil of Maerten de Vos and Gerard de Jode. Prior to 1578 he studied engraving in Rome with Cornelis Cort. After that, he returned to Antwerp, eventually moving to Bavaria, where he was appointed engraver to William IV, Duke of Bavaria and the Elector of Cologne. During this time, he may also have worked in Paris for publisher Nicolas Le Bon.

In 1584 Juan de Herrera commissioned Perret to print images of the plants and topographical views of the Monastery of San Lorenzo Del Escorial. Herrera was to provide the copper plates already drawn by his hand, and Perret was to engrave them for a fee of 600 ducats. Perret moved to Madrid and was bound to take on no other work until the plates were engraved. However, the work was not completed until 1589. That year, they were collected in a small book titled Sumaria y breve declaración de los diseños y estampas de la fábrica de San Lorenzo del Escorial and sold by Herrera. Despite the prohibition on taking on other work, Perret published the first of his portraits, that of the Empress Maria of Austria, in 1585.

In 1590 he returned to Antwerp where he became a master in the Guild of Saint Luke in 1594. Between 1591 and 1595, he published some allegorical engravings based on drawings provided by Otto van Veen. Among them were works dedicated to Herrera and Philip II. Other works from this time are three small plates of prophets Daniel, Ezekiel, and Haggai, following designs by Nicolas van Houy for the work Icones prophetarum maiorum et minorum (1594) published in Antwerp by Philip Galle. Copies of these three plates are preserved in the Lázaro Galdiano Museum in Madrid.

In 1595 he was appointed as a court engraver by Philip II, with a salary of 100 ducats per year. With the royal appointment, he established himself in Madrid, focusing on book publishing. He focused not only on book covers and portraits, but also typographic marks and small ornaments. Perret published at least thirty-four books while in Madrid, with more in Lisbon, where he may have moved during the Iberian Union. 

Some of his best-known works of this time are portraits, including the Retrato de San Ignacio de Loyola included in the Obras of Father Ribadeneira.

Between 1609 and his death, he published the covers of most of the books in Madrid. The cover of the Eróticas or Amatorias, by Esteban Manuel de Villegas, printed in Nájera in 1618 by Juan de Mongastón, also seems to be by him.

Further reading

References

External links 

 

16th-century births
1625 deaths
Flemish engravers
Spanish engravers
Artists from Antwerp